Rudolf Arnold Maas Geesteranus (20 January 1911 in The Hague – May 18, 2003 in Oegstgeest), was a Dutch mycologist.

See also
 :Category:Taxa named by Rudolf Arnold Maas Geesteranus

References

1911 births
2003 deaths
Dutch mycologists
Scientists from The Hague
Leiden University alumni
Academic staff of Leiden University